The Hong Kong Observatory is a weather forecast agency of the government of Hong Kong. The Observatory forecasts the weather and issues warnings on weather-related hazards. It also monitors and makes assessments on radiation levels in Hong Kong and provides other meteorological and geophysical services to meet the needs of the public and the shipping, aviation, industrial and engineering sectors.

Overview 

Early operations included meteorological and magnetic observations, a time service based on astronomical observations and a tropical cyclone warning service. The Observatory was renamed the Royal Observatory Hong Kong after obtaining a Royal Charter in 1912. The Observatory adopted the current name and emblem in 1997 after the transfer of Hong Kong's sovereignty from the UK to China.

The Hong Kong Observatory was built in Tsim Sha Tsui, Kowloon in 1883. Observatory Road in Tsim Sha Tsui is so named based on this landmark. However, due to rapid urbanisation, it is now surrounded by skyscrapers. As a result of high greenhouse gas emissions, the reflection of sunlight from buildings and the surfaces of roads, as well as the reduced vegetation, it suffers from a heat island effect. This was demonstrated by the considerable increase in average temperatures recorded by the Observatory between 1980 and 2005. In 2002, the Observatory opened a resource centre on the 23rd Floor of the nearby Miramar Tower, where the public can buy Hong Kong Observatory publications and access other meteorological information.

Buildings in the observatory

1883 building 
This building, built in 1883, is a rectangular two-storey plastered brick structure. It is characterised by arched windows and long verandas. It now houses the office of the directorate and serves as the centre of administration of the Observatory. The building is a declared monument of Hong Kong since 1984.

The Hong Kong Observatory Headquarters 
This building is next to the 1883 Building; the Centenary Building, used as The Hong Kong Observatory Headquarters, was erected in 1983 as a commemoration of the centennial service of the Observatory.

Directors 
Over the years, the observatory has been led by:

Observatory logo

From 1885 to 1948, the HKO used the coat of arms of the United Kingdom in various styles for its logo but in 1949, this was changed to a circular escutcheon featuring pictures of weather observation tools, with the year 1883 at the bottom and a St Edward's Crown at the top. In 1981, the logo was changed to the old coat of arms, and in 1997, with the transfer of sovereignty over Hong Kong, the current logo was introduced to replace the colonial symbols.

Outreach activities and publicity 

The Friends of the Observatory, an interest group set up in 1996 to help the Observatory to promote Hong Kong Observatory and its services to the public, provide science extension activities in relation to the works of the Observatory and foster communication between the Observatory and the public, now has more than 7,000 individual and family members in total. Activities organised for the Friends of the Observatory include regular science lectures and visits to Observatory's facilities. Newsletters (named 談天說地) were also published for members once every four months. Voluntary docents from this interest group lead a "HKO Guided Tour" to let the public who applied for visit in advance to visit the headquarters of the Observatory, and learn about the history, environment and meteorological science applied by the Observatory.

The Observatory regularly organises visits for secondary school students. This outreach programme was extended to primary school students, the elderly and community groups in recent years. Talks are also organised in primary schools during the winter time, when officials are less busy in the severe climate issues and watchouts. A roving exhibition for the public was also mounted in shopping malls in 2003. To promote understanding of the services provided by the Observatory and their benefits to the community, over 50 press releases were issued and 7 media briefings were held in 2003. From time to time, the Observatory also works closely with schools for a series of events, including with the Geography Society of PLK Vicwood KT Chong Sixth Form College between 2008 and 2009.

See also 
Central Weather Bureau (Taiwan)
China Meteorological Administration
Climate of Hong Kong
Hong Kong rainstorm warning signals
Hong Kong Time
Hong Kong tropical cyclone warning signals
Macao Meteorological and Geophysical Bureau

References

External links 

 
 
 
 
 
 

Declared monuments of Hong Kong
Landmarks in Hong Kong
Observatory
Governmental meteorological agencies in Asia
Tsim Sha Tsui
Meteorological observatories
Geophysical observatories
1883 establishments in Hong Kong
Organisations based in Hong Kong with former royal patronage
Climate of Hong Kong